Samuel Robert Foley (born 17 October 1986) is a professional footballer who plays as a midfielder for  club Barrow. Born in England, he has represented the Republic of Ireland at youth level. 

A former Republic of Ireland youth international, he began his career at Cheltenham Town, and though he played on loan at Bath City he left Cheltenham in 2008 without making a first team appearance. He then spent a year with Kidderminster Harriers, who in turn loaned him on to Redditch United and Newport County. He joined Newport in June 2009, and helped them to win the Conference South title in 2009–10 and to the 2012 FA Trophy Final. He returned to the English Football League with Yeovil Town in July 2012, and played in the club's 2013 League One play-off final victory that took them into the Championship. He lost his first team place in the 2013–14 season and joined Shrewsbury Town on loan, before winning Yeovil's Player of the Year award in the 2014–15 season as the club dropped into League Two. He joined Port Vale in June 2015, and left after two seasons to join Northampton Town in May 2017, where he would remain for another two seasons. He joined Scottish club St Mirren in August 2019 and was named as the club's Player of the Year for the 2019–20 season. He spent the second half of the 2020–21 season at Motherwell, before returning to England with Tranmere Rovers in July 2021. He joined Barrow in July 2022.

Career

Early career
Foley signed a two-year professional contract with Cheltenham Town in 2006. However he spent much of time at Whaddon Road out injured with osteitis pubis and never made a first team appearance for the "Robins". He spent part of the 2007–08 season on loan at Conference South Bath City, and scored two goals in seven appearances for the "Romans".

In August 2008 he signed a one-year contract with Kidderminster Harriers after impressing manager Mark Yates during a trial spell. He was sent out on loan to Conference North side Redditch United in October 2008. He scored two goals in seven games and "Reds" manager Gary Whild wanted an extended loan spell, but Foley was recalled to Kidderminster in December. He went on to spend the second half of the 2008–09 season on loan at Conference South club Newport County, scoring four goals in 14 appearances. He left Aggborough without making a first team appearance for the Harriers after rejecting the offer of a new contract.

Newport County
In June 2009, Foley was signed by Newport County manager Dean Holdsworth. Foley was immediately a regular in the team, filling all midfield and forward roles at various times but mostly played as a supporting striker alongside Craig Reid. In the 2009–10 season County were crowned Conference South champions with a record 103 points, 28 points ahead of second placed Dover Athletic. He remained a key player in the 2010–11 season, scoring five goals in 44 games as Newport posted a ninth-place finish in the Conference Premier. Three of his goals came on 11 October, in a 4–1 win over Fleetwood Town at Highbury Stadium, in what was new manager Justin Edinburgh's first win at the club. On 12 May, Foley played at Wembley Stadium in the 2012 FA Trophy Final, which Newport lost 2–0 to York City. He scored 12 goals in 49 appearances during the 2011–12 season and rejected the offer of a new contract at the end of the season.

Yeovil Town
Foley signed for League One club Yeovil Town on a one-year contract in July 2012. On 14 August, Foley made his Yeovil debut in the League Cup in a 3–0 victory over Colchester United, and scored his first competitive goal for the side on 4 September in a 3–0 Football League Trophy win at Bristol Rovers. On 19 May, Foley played in the 2013 League One play-off final as Yeovil beat Brentford 2–1 to secure promotion to the Championship. In total he scored seven goals in 51 appearances in the 2012–13 campaign, mostly from left-wing. He signed a new two-year contract in June 2013.

He played just nine times in the 2013–14 season as the "Glovers" were relegated out of the Championship. On 7 March 2014, Foley joined League One side Shrewsbury Town on an initial one-month loan. After making nine appearances for the "Shrews", Foley was recalled to Huish Park on 16 April. With Yeovil back in League One Foley was restored to the first team for the 2014–15 campaign and featured 45 times, mainly in central midfield, as the club suffered a second successive relegation. Though the season was a poor one for the club Foley managed to find success on an individual level, winning the Western Gazette's Player of the Year award. He rejected the offer of a new contract in the summer in favour of a move to remain in League One.

Port Vale
In June 2015, Foley signed a two-year contract with League One club Port Vale. He said his aim was to secure a regular first team place in central midfield. He went on to score six goals in 50 appearances throughout the 2015–16 season, and was also the club's penalty-taker, converting two of four penalty kicks. Manager Rob Page played him both in central midfield and on the left-side of midfield throughout the campaign, and told the media that Foley was "outstanding" in both roles.

He remained a key player under new manager Bruno Ribeiro, and missed just two of the opening 15 league games of the 2016–17 season, being named on the EFL team of the week after providing two assists in a 3–1 win over Scunthorpe United at Vale Park on 27 August. However he was forced to undergo surgery on a long-standing ankle injury in October. He returned to training after a three-month recovery spell. In February 2017, he was praised by caretaker-manager Michael Brown for playing despite being below full fitness during a difficult period for the club. He scored his first goal of the season in a crucial 2–1 home win against relegation rivals Shrewsbury Town on 17 March.

Northampton Town
In May 2017, Foley rejected the offer of a new contract at Port Vale to remain in League One on a two-year contract with Northampton Town; the move reunited him with former Newport manager Justin Edinburgh. Port Vale manager Michael Brown said that Port Vale had offered a better wage than Northampton, but Foley had wanted to play at as high a level as possible. He lost his first-team place under new manager Jimmy Floyd Hasselbaink and scored three goals in 28 appearances for the "Cobblers" as the club were relegated at the end of the 2017–18 season. He scored two goals in 40 appearances in the 2018–19 campaign, maintaining his first-team place under first Dean Austin and then Keith Curle, before he was released on 6 May.

St Mirren
On 1 August 2019, Foley signed a two-year deal with Scottish Premiership side St Mirren. He stepped in as the "Saints" team captain during the absence of Stephen McGinn and Kyle Magennis in January. He went on to win the vote for the PDE St Mirren player of the year award for the 2019–20 season; he said that "I’ve won a few awards throughout my career though and I see them as a reward for hard work on and off the pitch. When you get to my age it’s about a love of the job and football is my trade. You need to have a willingness and desire to work hard." He played 15 games in the first half of the 2020–21 season before being benched.

Motherwell
On 29 January 2021, Foley signed for Motherwell on a contract until the end of the 2020–21 season. A back injury meant that he featured just five times for the "Steelmen", feeling that due to the team's form that he "wasn't in a position to knock on the manager's (Graham Alexander) door". After spending a long time on the sidelines he admitted to thinking "god I hope I remember how to play this game!" He was released by Motherwell at the end of the season.

Tranmere Rovers
Foley signed a one-year contract with League Two club Tranmere Rovers on 22 July 2021, with manager Micky Mellon citing his "experience, leg power and he is a great athlete". In October, he was described as "an instrumental figure for Rovers" as the team put together a run of form to reach the top six. He ended the 2021–22 season with four goals in 45 appearances, though Tranmere missed out on the play-offs on the final day.

Barrow
Foley signed a one-year contract with fellow League Two club Barrow on 21 June 2022, with the player joining the club on expiration of his Tranmere contract in July.

Style of play
Foley can operate on the left or centre of midfield, and has good dribbling, passing and ball control skills. He is an intelligent player with a good work rate, but lacks natural pace.

Career statistics

Honours
Newport County
Conference South: 2009–10
FA Trophy runner-up: 2011–12

Yeovil Town
Football League One play-offs: 2013

Individual
Yeovil Town Player of the Year (Western Gazette): 2014–15
St Mirren Player of the Year: 2019–20

References

External links

1986 births
Living people
Sportspeople from St Albans
English footballers
English people of Irish descent
Republic of Ireland association footballers
Republic of Ireland youth international footballers
Association football midfielders
Cheltenham Town F.C. players
Bath City F.C. players
Kidderminster Harriers F.C. players
Redditch United F.C. players
Newport County A.F.C. players
Yeovil Town F.C. players
Shrewsbury Town F.C. players
Port Vale F.C. players
Northampton Town F.C. players
St Mirren F.C. players
Motherwell F.C. players
Tranmere Rovers F.C. players
Barrow A.F.C. players
National League (English football) players
English Football League players
Scottish Professional Football League players